The Anglican Diocese of Enugu is one of 12 within the Anglican Province of Enugu, itself one of 14 provinces within the Church of Nigeria. The current bishop is Emmanuel Chukwuma, who is also Archbishop of the Province

References

Church of Nigeria dioceses
Dioceses of the Province of Enugu